The 2002 Russian Figure Skating Championships took place in Moscow from December 27 to 29, 2001. Skaters competed in the disciplines of men's singles, ladies' singles, pair skating, and ice dancing. The results were one of the criteria used to pick the Russian teams to the 2002 World Championships and the 2002 European Championships.

Senior results

Men
Alexei Yagudin withdrew due to a twisted ankle.

Ladies

Pairs

Ice dancing

References

External links
 results

2001 in figure skating
Russian Figure Skating Championships, 2002
Figure skating
Russian Figure Skating Championships